25 Ores (Greek: 25 Ώρες; English: 25 hours) is the 11th studio album by Greek singer-songwriter and record producer Nikos Karvelas, released by Sony Music Greece in July 1995. The album was certified gold with 30,000 copies sold.

Track listing

External links 
 Official site

1995 albums
Albums produced by Nikos Karvelas
Greek-language albums
Nikos Karvelas albums
Sony Music Greece albums